Ewin Lamar Davis (February 5, 1876October 23, 1949)  was an American politician and a member of the United States House of Representatives for the 5th congressional district of Tennessee.

Biography
Davis was born in Bedford County, Tennessee, son of McLin H. and Christina Lee (Shoffner) Davis; and  brother of Norman Hezekiah Davis. He attended public schools, including The Webb School in Bell Buckle, Tennessee, and  Woolwine School in Tullahoma, Tennessee.  From 1895 to 1897 he was a student at Vanderbilt University in Nashville, Tennessee.    He married Carolyn Windsor on December 28, 1898, and they had five children, Windsor, Margaret, Ewin, Latham, and Carolyn.  He graduated from Columbian (now The George Washington University Law School) in Washington, D.C., in 1899. He was admitted to the bar the same year and commenced practice in Tullahoma, Tennessee.

Career
Davis was a delegate to all state Democratic conventions from 1900 to 1910. From 1910 through 1918, he was a judge of the Seventh Judicial Circuit of Tennessee. He also acted as Chairman of the district exemption board for the middle district of Tennessee in 1917 and 1918.

From 1903 to 1940, Davis was the director of the Traders National Bank of Tullahoma, and was a trustee of the Tennessee College for Women from 1906 to 1939. He was also a member of the Federal Trade Commission from May 23, 1933, until his death, serving as Chairman in 1935, 1940, and 1945.

Davis was elected as a Democrat to the Sixty-sixth Congress and to the six succeeding Congresses, serving from March 4, 1919, until March 3, 1933. During the Seventy-second Congress he was the chairman of the United States House Committee on Merchant Marine and Fisheries. He was an unsuccessful candidate for renomination in 1932. In 1936, he was a member of the American National Committee of the Third World Power Conference.

Among Davis's legislative acts was the so-called "Davis Amendment" to the 1927 Radio Act. The 1928 reauthorization of the Radio Act included a provision, sponsored by Davis, that required each region of the country to have equal allocations of radio licenses, station power, etc. This greatly complicated things for the Federal Radio Commission, who was in charge of licensing radio stations; they were required to deny station applications to otherwise qualified candidates simply because the new station would put a particular state or region over its quota. For example, the northeast had a greater population than the southwest, but was limited to the same number of stations as more sparsely populated areas. Likewise, many small communities in the southwest could have added a local station without increasing interference (because of their remoteness), but were prevented from doing so by the Davis Amendment.  The Davis Amendment was ultimately repealed on June 5, 1936.

Death
Davis died in Washington, D.C. on October 23, 1949 (age 73 years, 260 days) and is interred in Oakwood Cemetery in Tullahoma, Tennessee.

References

External links
 

1876 births
1949 deaths
Webb School (Bell Buckle, Tennessee) alumni
Vanderbilt University alumni
George Washington University Law School alumni
Democratic Party members of the United States House of Representatives from Tennessee
People from Bedford County, Tennessee
Franklin D. Roosevelt administration personnel
Truman administration personnel